Aleksey Barannikov (born 13 May 1975) is a Russian skier. He competed in the Nordic combineds at the 2002 Winter Olympics and the 2006 Winter Olympics.

References

External links
 

1975 births
Living people
Russian male Nordic combined skiers
Olympic Nordic combined skiers of Russia
Nordic combined skiers at the 2002 Winter Olympics
Nordic combined skiers at the 2006 Winter Olympics
Skiers from Moscow